Clodia is a genus of beetles in the family Cerambycidae, containing the following species:

 Clodia biflavoguttata Breuning, 1959
 Clodia decorata Nonfried, 1894
 Clodia flavoguttata Breuning, 1957
 Clodia sublineata Pascoe, 1864
 Clodia vittata Aurivillius, 1927

References

Acanthocinini
Cerambycidae genera